The Shops at West Seneca is a shopping mall south of Buffalo, New York, United States. Built in 1969 as an enclosed shopping mall called Seneca Mall, it is in the Town of West Seneca at the intersection of Ridge Road (Erie CR 137) and Slade Avenue (Erie CR 91) immediately east of the New York State Thruway (Interstate 90).

History
The William Hengerer Company originally sought to develop a location on this site in the early 1960s.  This eventually led to the development and opening of Seneca Mall in 1969 in direct competition to The Thruway Plaza. The mall at that time housed a large JCPenney store as well as local chain Sattler's.

Seneca Mall was the major mall in the southtowns of Buffalo from its opening in 1969 through the 1980s. Seneca hung on until 1989 when the Walden Galleria opened in Cheektowaga. At that time, all of the mall anchors vacated as well as most of the specialty stores and restaurants. The mall remained open until 1994, finally becoming a haven for mall walkers with no retailers.

In 1994, the mall's owners, The Pyramid Company, elected to demolish the mall. The company, which also owns the Walden Galleria, elected to build a power center on the site once the mall and outlying buildings were demolished.  The center was branded as The Shops at West Seneca and its first tenant (Tops Markets) opened in May 1997 followed by Kmart in 2000. Although many elaborate plans were put forth by Pyramid, no other stores were built. The lack of development on the former mall site has been a topic of debate for City of Seneca officials, many of whom have cited the former mall lot as blight.

See also
 Walden Galleria
 The Summit
 Eastern Hills Mall
 Boulevard Mall

References

Shopping malls in New York (state)
Buildings and structures in Erie County, New York
Shopping malls established in 1969
Buffalo–Niagara Falls metropolitan area